At Samat is a district (amphoe) of Roi Et province, Thailand.

เมืองไทย 
The district is in central Roi Et Province. Neighboring districts are (from the north clockwise): Thawat Buri, Thung Khao Luang, Selaphum, Phanom Phrai, Suwannaphum, Mueang Suang, Chaturaphak Phiman (at a single point) and Mueang Roi Et.

History 
The district was created in 1897, at first named Sa But (สระบุศย์). In 1913 it was renamed At Samat.

In January 2006 Prime Minister Thaksin Shinawatra chose At Samat as the model district for his poverty eradication program. He visited the district and led a five-day workshop. The event was shown as a reality TV show named Backstage: The Prime Minister.

Administration

Central administration 
The At Samat District  is divided into 10 sub-districts (tambons), which are further subdivided into 139 administrative villages (mubans).

Local administration 
There are two sub-district municipalities (thesaban tambons) in the district:
 At Samat consisting of parts of sub-district At Samat.
 Phon Mueang consisting of sub-district Phon Mueang.

There are nine sub-district administrative organizations (SAO) in the district:
 At Samat consisting of parts of sub-district At Samat.
 Ban Chaeng consisting of sub-district Ban Chaeng.
 Nom consisting of sub-district Nom.
 Nong Muen Than consisting of sub-district Nong Muen Than.
 Nong Kham consisting of sub-district Nong Kham.
 Hora consisting of sub-district Hora.
 Nong Bua consisting of sub-district Nong Bua.
 Khilek consisting of sub-district Khilek.
 Ban Du consisting of sub-district Ban Du.

References

External links
 Amphoe (Thai)

At Samat